Woodglen may refer to:

Woodglen, Alberta, Canada
Woodglen, New Jersey, USA